Chariesthes apicalis is a species of beetle in the family Cerambycidae. It was described by Péringuey in 1885, originally under the genus Tragiscoschema. It has a wide distribution in Africa.

References

Chariesthes
Beetles described in 1885